The 2018 Peru Cup season, the largest amateur tournament of Peruvian football, started in February.

This edition has featured a change, with the elimination of the Regional Stage and the inclusion of participants from all the Regions of Peru in the National Stage. Under the new format, the tournament has four stages. The first three stages are played as mini-league round-robin tournaments, and the fourth stage is played under POT System intellectual property of the MatchVision company.

The 2018 Peru Cup started with the District Stage in February.  The next stage was the Provincial Stage which started in June. The tournament continued with the Departmental Stage in July. The National Stage starts in September. The winner of the National Stage will be promoted to the First Division and the runner-up will be promoted to the Second Division.

Departmental stage
Departmental Stage: 2018 Ligas Departamentales del Peru and 2018 Ligas Superiores del Perú

The following list shows the teams that qualified for the National Stage.

National stage
In 2015 the National Stage has grown to 50 teams, and the new National Stage, designed by matchVision, is played under Regional using the POT System, with all the Regions of Peru will have represented. The National Stage starts in the first week of September.

In 2017 the same format continues, without the authorization of MatchVision.

This phase features the 50 teams that qualified from the Departmental Stage. Each team plays 3 games at home and 3 games away, for a total of 6 games against 3 different geographical rivals. The departmental stage winners only play against departmental runners-up, and vice versa. All the teams are positioned in one general table. After 6 matches, the team in places 1 to 8 are qualified directly to the Round of 16, while the teams in places 9 to 24 will play the Repechage phase. The teams in places 25 to 50 are eliminated.

The winner of the National Stage will be promoted to the 2019 Torneo Descentralizado and the runner-up of the National Stage will be promoted to the 2019 Peruvian Segunda División.

Tie-breaking criteria 
The ranking of teams in the Unique Table is based on the following criteria:
 1.	Number of Points
 3.	Goal difference
 4.	Number of goals scored
 5.	Better performance in away matches based on the following criteria:
        1.	Number of Away Points
        3.	Goal Difference in away games
        4.	Number of goals scored in away games
 6.	Number of First-Half points: considering the half-time results as the final results
 6.	Drawing of lots

League table

Round 1

|-

|}

Round 2

|-

|}

Round 3

|-

|}

Round 4

|-

|}

Round 5

|-

|}

Round 6

|-

|}

Second round

|-

|-

|-

|-

|-

|-

|-

|-

|-
|}

Round of 16

|-

|-

|-

|-

|-

|-

|-

|-

|-
|}

Quarterfinals

|-

|-

|-

|-

|-
|}

Final group stage

The final group stage, colloquially known as La Finalísima, will be played by the four semifinalist at the Estadio Nacional. The team with the most points will be declared the winner and be promoted to the 2019 Torneo Descentralizado.

Round 1

Round 2

Round 3

Promotion play-off

See also
 2018 Torneo Descentralizado
 2018 Peruvian Segunda División

References

External links
 Official Website
  Dechalaca Copa Peru
  Semanario Pasión

2018
Peru
2018 in Peruvian football